Aoteadrillia is a genus of sea snails, marine gastropod mollusks in the family Horaiclavidae.

It was previously categorized within the subfamily Crassispirinae, Turridae.

Species
Species within the genus Aoteadrillia include:
 † Aoteadrillia alpha (L. C. King, 1933) 
 † Aoteadrillia apicarinata (P. Marshall & R. Murdoch, 1923) 
 † Aoteadrillia asper (Marwick, 1931) 
 Aoteadrillia bulbacea (Watson, 1881)
 † Aoteadrillia callimorpha (Suter, 1917) 
 † Aoteadrillia consequens (Laws, 1936) 
 † Aoteadrillia exigua (Marwick, 1931) 
 Aoteadrillia finlayi Powell, 1942
 † Aoteadrillia ihungia (Marwick, 1931) 
 Aoteadrillia otagoensis Powell, 1942
 † Aoteadrillia waihuaensis Powell, 1942 
 Aoteadrillia wanganuiensis (Hutton, 1873)
Species brought into synonymy
 Aoteadrillia chordata (Suter, 1908): synonym of  Aoteadrillia wanganuiensis (Hutton, 1873)
 Aoteadrillia rawitensis (Hedley, 1922): synonym of Austrodrillia rawitensis Hedley, 1922
 Aoteadrillia thomsoni Powell, 1942: synonym of Aoteadrillia wanganuiensis (Hutton, 1873)
 Aoteadrillia trifida Powell, 1942: synonym of Aoteadrillia wanganuiensis (Hutton, 1873)

References

 Bouchet P., Kantor Yu.I., Sysoev A. & Puillandre N. (2011) A new operational classification of the Conoidea. Journal of Molluscan Studies 77: 273-308.

External links
  Tucker, J.K. 2004 Catalog of recent and fossil turrids (Mollusca: Gastropoda). Zootaxa 682:1-1295.

 
Horaiclavidae
Gastropods of New Zealand
Gastropod genera